The Russellville Commercial Historic District, in Russellville, Alabama, is a historic district which was listed on the National Register of Historic Places in 2019.

Russellville's 2017 Downtown Redevelopment Plan identified a twelve block area including 117 buildings as a historic "downtown core" area.

In 2018, the mayor and city staff met with people about it.  There was interest in creating a National Register listing in order to make renovations in the district eligible for 20% tax credits.

References

Historic districts on the National Register of Historic Places in Alabama
National Register of Historic Places in Franklin County, Alabama